Xerox Escape Sequence or XES is a page description language (PDL) developed by Xerox corporation and introduced with their 2700 laser printers in 1982.  XES offers similar capabilities to Hewlett-Packard's Printer Command Language (PCL), which first appeared in 1984.  XES is supported by most Xerox laser printers including the 2700. 3700, 4011, 4030, 4045, 4197, 4213, 4235, and 4700.

XES is sometimes known as UDK, from User Defined Key, the character which introduces the printer command, usually the escape character (ESC).

References

External links
 Xerox 4213 Laser Printer Programmer Reference

Computer printing
Page description languages
Escape Sequence